The Socorro Water Towers are historic water towers in the barangay of Socorro in Quezon City, Metro Manila, Philippines.

History
The Socorro Water Towers were built in the 1930s, during the United States administration of the Philippines. The complex consist of two water towers, with the newer structure being built a year apart and has smaller dimensions than the older tower. The towers were built to serve residents of modern-day Cubao area.

The water towers survived World War II and sometime after the Philippines was granted independence after the war, the structures and the associated property were turned over to the National Waterworks and Sewerage Authority (Nawasa; later the Metropolitan Waterworks and Sewerage System or MWSS). By the 1950s, the water towers became non-operational. Following the creation of barangay Socorro in the following decade, the barangay hall for the newly created barangay was allowed to be built within the water towers' associated property with the help of First Lady Imelda Marcos. The site then was known as Imelda Park. One of the tanks sustained two holes amidst the 1989 coup d'état attempt during the Presidency of Corazon Aquino, but the tower was repaired afterwards.

Facilities
The Socorro Water Towers consist of two concrete towers estimated to have heights equivalent to 12 to 15 stories. The base of the towers hosts spaces for the local government of barangay Socorro, including its barangay hall which is built in between the two water towers. The back portion of the towers hosts a covered basketball court and a daycare center.

References

Water towers in the Philippines
Towers completed in the 1930s
Local government buildings in Metro Manila
Buildings and structures in Quezon City
20th-century architecture in the Philippines